Li-Fi (also written as LiFi) is a wireless communication technology which utilizes light to transmit data and position between devices. The term was first introduced by Harald Haas during a 2011 TEDGlobal talk in Edinburgh.

Li-Fi is a light communication system that is capable of transmitting data at high speeds over the visible light, ultraviolet, and infrared spectrums. In its present state, only LED lamps can be used for the transmission of data in visible light.

In terms of its end user, the technology is similar to Wi-Fi — the key technical difference being that Wi-Fi uses radio frequency to induce a voltage in an antenna to transmit data, whereas Li-Fi uses the modulation of light intensity to transmit data. Li-Fi is able to function in areas otherwise susceptible to electromagnetic interference (e.g. aircraft cabins, hospitals, or the military).

Bg-Fi is a Li-Fi system consisting of an application for a mobile device, and a simple consumer product, like an IoT (Internet of Things) device, with color sensor, microcontroller, and embedded software. Light from the mobile device display communicates to the color sensor on the consumer product, which converts the light into digital information. Light-emitting diodes enable the consumer product to communicate synchronously with the mobile device.

Technology details 

Li-Fi is a derivative of optical wireless communications (OWC) technology, which uses light from light-emitting diodes (LEDs) as a medium to deliver network, mobile, high-speed communication in a similar manner to Wi-Fi. The Li-Fi market was projected to have a compound annual growth rate of 82% from 2013 to 2018 and to be worth over $6 billion per year by 2018. However, the market has not developed as such and Li-Fi remains with a niche market.

Visible light communications (VLC) works by switching the current to the LEDs off and on at a very high speed, beyond the human eye's ability to notice. Technologies that allow roaming between various Li-Fi cells, also known as handover, may allow to seamlessly transition between Li-Fi. The light waves cannot penetrate walls which translates to a much shorter range, and a lower hacking potential, relative to Wi-Fi. Direct line of sight is not always necessary for Li-Fi to transmit a signal and light reflected off walls can achieve 70 Mbit/s.

Li-Fi can potentially be useful in electromagnetic sensitive areas without causing electromagnetic interference. Both Wi-Fi and Li-Fi transmit data over the electromagnetic spectrum, but whereas Wi-Fi utilizes radio waves, Li-Fi uses visible, ultraviolet, and infrared light.  Researchers have reached data rates of over  224 Gbit/s, which was much faster than typical fast broadband in 2013. Li-Fi is expected to be ten times cheaper than Wi-Fi. The first commercially available Li-Fi system was presented at the 2014 Mobile World Congress in Barcelona.

Disadvantages 
Although Li-Fi LEDs would have to be kept on to transmit data, they could be dimmed to below human visibility while still emitting enough light to carry data. This is also a major bottleneck of the technology when based on the visible spectrum, as it is restricted to the illumination purpose and not ideally adjusted to a mobile communication purpose, given that other sources of light, for example the sun, will interfere with the signal.

Since Li-Fi's short wave range is unable to penetrate walls, transmitters would need to installed in every room of a building to ensure even Li-Fi distribution. The high installation costs associated with this requirement to achieve a level of practicality of the technology is one of the potential downsides.

History 
Professor Harald Haas, Professor of Mobile Communications at the University of Edinburgh, coined the term "Li-Fi" at his 2011 TED Global Talk where he introduced the idea of "wireless data from every light". 

The general term "visible light communication" (VLC), whose history dates back to the 1880s, includes any use of the visible light portion of the electromagnetic spectrum to transmit information. The D-Light project at Edinburgh's Institute for Digital Communications was funded from January 2010 to January 2012. Haas helped start a company to market it.

In October 2011, a research organisation Fraunhofer IPMS and industry Companies formed the Li-Fi Consortium, to promote high-speed optical wireless systems and to overcome the limited amount of radio-based wireless spectrum available by exploiting a completely different part of the electromagnetic spectrum.

VLC technology was exhibited in 2012 using Li-Fi. By August 2013, data rates of about 1.6 Gbit/s were demonstrated over a single color LED. In September 2013, a press release said that Li-Fi, or VLC systems in general, do not absolutely require line-of-sight conditions. In October 2013, it was reported Chinese manufacturers were working on Li-Fi development kits.

In April 2014, the Russian company Stins Coman announced the development of a Li-Fi wireless local network called BeamCaster. Their current module transfers data at 1.25 gigabytes per second (GB/s) but they foresee boosting speeds up to 5 GB/s in the near future. In 2014 a new record was established by Sisoft (a Mexican company) that was able to transfer data at speeds of up to 10GB/s across a light spectrum emitted by LED lamps.

In July 2015, IEEE operated the APD in Geiger-mode as a single photon avalanche diode (SPAD) to increase the efficiency of energy-usage and makes the receiver even more sensitive. This operation could also be performed as quantum-limited sensitivity that makes receivers able to detect weak signals from a far distance.

In June 2018, Li-Fi passed a test by a BMW plant in Munich for operating in an industrial environment. 

in August 2018, Kyle Academy, a secondary school in Scotland, had pilot the use of Li-Fi within the school. Students are able to receive data through a connection between their laptop computers and a USB device that is able to translate the rapid on-off current from the ceiling LEDs into data.

In June 2019, French company Oledcomm tested their Li-Fi technology at the 2019 Paris Air Show.

Standards 
Like Wi-Fi, Li-Fi is wireless and uses  similar 802.11 protocols, but it also uses ultraviolet, infrared and visible light communication. 

One part of VLC is modeled after communication protocols established by the IEEE 802 workgroup. However, the IEEE 802.15.7 standard is out-of-date: it fails to consider the latest technological developments in the field of optical wireless communications, specifically with the introduction of optical orthogonal frequency-division multiplexing (O-OFDM) modulation methods which have been optimized for data rates, multiple-access, and energy efficiency. The introduction of O-OFDM means that a new drive for standardization of optical wireless communications is required.

Nonetheless, the IEEE 802.15.7 standard defines the physical layer (PHY) and media access control (MAC) layer. The standard is able to deliver enough data rates to transmit audio, video, and multimedia services. It takes into account optical transmission mobility, its compatibility with artificial lighting present in infrastructures, and the interference which may be generated by ambient lighting.
The MAC layer permits using the link with the other layers as with the TCP/IP protocol.

The standard defines three PHY layers with different rates:
 The PHY 1 was established for outdoor application and works from 11.67 kbit/s to 267.6 kbit/s.
 The PHY 2 layer permits reaching data rates from 1.25 Mbit/s to 96 Mbit/s.
 The PHY 3 is used for many emissions sources with a particular modulation method called color shift keying (CSK). PHY III can deliver rates from 12 Mbit/s to 96 Mbit/s.

The modulation formats recognized for PHY I and PHY II are on-off keying (OOK) and variable pulse-position modulation (VPPM). The Manchester coding used for the PHY I and PHY II layers includes the clock inside the transmitted data by representing a logic 0 with an OOK symbol "01" and a logic 1 with an OOK symbol "10", all with a DC component. The DC component avoids light extinction in case of an extended run of logic 0's.

Applications

Home and building automation 
Many experts foresee a movement towards Li-Fi in homes because it has the potential for faster speeds and its security benefits with how the technology works. Because the light sends the data, the network can be contained in a single physical room or building reducing the possibility of a remote network attack. Though this has more implications in enterprise and other sectors, home usage may be pushed forward with the rise of home automation that requires large volumes of data to be transferred through the local network.

Underwater application 
Most remotely operated underwater vehicles (ROVs) are controlled by wired connections. The length of their cabling places a hard limit on their operational range, and other potential factors such as the cable's weight and fragility may be restrictive. Since light can travel through water, Li-Fi based communications could offer much greater mobility. Li-Fi's utility is limited by the distance light can penetrate water. Significant amounts of light do not penetrate further than 200 meters. Past 1000 meters, no light penetrates.

Aviation 
Efficient communication of data is possible in airborne environments such as a commercial passenger aircraft utilizing Li-Fi. Using this light-based data transmission will not interfere with equipment on the aircraft that relies on radio waves such as its radar.

Hospital 
Increasingly, medical facilities are using remote examinations and even procedures. Li-Fi systems could offer a better system to transmit low latency, high volume data across networks. Besides providing a higher speed, light waves also have reduced effects on medical instruments. An example of this would be the possibility of wireless devices being used in MRIs similar radio sensitive procedures. Another application of LiFi in hospitals is localisation of assets and personnel.

Vehicles 
Vehicles could communicate with one another via front and back lights to increase road safety. Street lights and traffic signals could also provide information about current road situations.

Industrial automation
Anywhere in industrial areas data has to be transmitted, Li-Fi is capable of replacing slip rings, sliding contacts, and short cables, such as Industrial Ethernet. Due to the real-time of Li-Fi (which is often required for automation processes), it is also an alternative to common industrial Wireless LAN standards. Fraunhofer IPMS, a research organization in Germany states that they have developed a component which is very appropriate for industrial applications with time-sensitive data transmission.

Advertising 
Street lamps can be used to display advertisements for nearby businesses or attractions on cellular devices as an individual passes through. A customer walking into a store and passing through the store's front lights can show current sales and promotions on the customer's cellular device.

Warehousing 
In warehousing, indoor positioning and navigation is a crucial element. 3D positioning helps robots to get a more detailed and realistic visual experience. Visible light from LED bulbs is used to send messages to the robots and other receivers and hence can be used to calculate the positioning of the objects.

See also 
 Bluetooth
 Free-space optical communication
Heliograph
 Indoor positioning system (IPS)
 Infrared communication
 IrDA
 Near Field Communication (NFC)
 Wi-Fi positioning system
 RONJA
 Spatial light modulator (SLM)
 Super Wi-Fi
 Wi-Fi Direct
 Wi-Fi

References

External links

 LiFi and WiFi Future Network Technology “Lifi” Know How Much Speed sameotech.com

 Introduction to Li-Fi Technology. electronicslovers.com
What exactly is Li-Fi?

Telecommunications-related introductions in 2011
Wireless networking
Optical communications
University of Edinburgh School of Informatics